Tadahiko Shintani (born October 1946) is a Japanese linguist and Professor Emeritus of the Tokyo University of Foreign Studies, specializing in the phonology of New Caledonian languages and Southeast Asian languages.

Shintani is from Ishikawa Prefecture. He graduated from Department of French Studies at Sophia University in 1970, and completed his studies at the Ecole Pratique des Hautes Etudes in 1974. In 1977 he was appointed assistant professor at the Institute of Languages and Cultures of Asia and Africa at the Tokyo University of Foreign Studies, and was promoted to associate professor in 1987 and full professor in 1995. He retired in 2011.

In the 1990s, he led a group of Japanese linguists researching the languages of northern Laos. He is a prominent advocate of the concept of a Tai Cultural Area, which he uses to refer to the area of continental Southeast Asia―including Yunnan and Guangxi in China and Assam in India―that is inhabited by ethnic groups that speak Tai languages.

Selected works
Linguistic research and Shan culture area, and Chicken, Poultry Resources Study Group Report No. 4 pp. 25–29 Poultry Resources Study Group · Tokyo 2005.6.14
Austroasiatic tone languages of the Tai Cultural Area - aroma of typhal studies of Tonal Phenomena, Shigeki Kaji ed. pp. 271 – 292 Asia-Africa Institute for Language and Culture 2005.12.14
Linguistic Survey of Phongxaly, Lao P.D.R. (co-edited) Tokyo University of Foreign Studies Asia-Africa Institute for Language and Culture, 234, 2001
Shan (Tay) phonology theory and character method, (co-authored) Tokyo University of Foreign Studies Asia-Africa Institute for Language and Culture, 112, 2000
Miao-Yao from the viewpoint of language, Asian studies, No. 9, 149 - 157, 1999
Linguistic & Anthropologologist Study on the Shan Culture Area (edited) Tokyo University of Foreign Studies Asia-Africa Institute for Language and Culture, 246, 1999
Basic Vocabularies of the Languages Spoken in Phongxaly, Lao P.D.R. (co-edited) Tokyo University of Foreign Studies Language and Culture Research Institute for Asia and Africa, 359, 1999
Golden square area - History, language and ethnicity of Shan culture area, (edited) Keigo Shosha, 326, 1998
Deux Textes en Langue de Gonen (Nouvelle - Caledonie) "Asia-Africa Language and Culture Studies" 46 · 47, 362 - 374, 1994

LSTCA series
The Linguistic survey of Tay cultural area (LSTCA) series of vocabularies by Tadahiko Shintani is published by the Research Institute for Languages and Cultures of Asia and Africa (ILCAA).

no. 101. The Riang language. 2008
no. 102. The Zayein language. 2014
no. 103. The Wadamkhong language. 2014
no. 104. The Shanke language. 2015
no. 105. The Zotung language. 2015
no. 106. The Kadaw language. 2015
no. 107. The Siam (Hsem) language. 2016
no. 108. The Va (En) language. 2016
no. 109. The Nangki language. 2016
no. 110. The Matu language. 2016
no. 111. The Gokhu language. 2017
no. 112. The Blimaw language. 2017
no. 113. The Khwingsang language. 2018
no. 114. The Khrangkhu language. 2018
no. 115. The Yingtalay language. 2018
no. 116. The Thaidai language. 2018
no. 117. The Makuri language. 2018
no. 118. The Sonkan Kayan language. 2018
no. 119. The Kokak language. 2018
no. 120. The Dosanbu Kayan language. 2018
no. 121. The Sen Tsum (I-Mok) language. 2019
no. 122. The Phulon Kayan language. 2019
no. 123. The Lagu Kayan language. 2019
no. 124. The Totan Kayan language. 2019
no. 125. The Dokhoncon Kayan language. 2019
no. 126. The Thamidai language. 2020
no. 127. The Kanaw (Danaw) language. 2020
no. 128. The Nantwei Kayan language. 2020
no. 129. The Pimon Kayan language. 2020
no. 130. The Sonplao Kayan language. 2020
no. 131. The Pao language: its Taunggyi and Kokareit dialects. 2020
no. 132. The Dolan Kayan language. 2021
no. 133. The Thaoku Kayan language. 2021
no. 134. The Diklon Kayan language. 2021
no. 135. The Pulon Kayan language. 2021
no. 136. The Kabla Kayan language. 2021
no. 137. The Kathan Kayan language. 2021
no. 138. The Kalondei Kayan language. 2021
no. 139. The Ramaku Kayan language. 2022
no. 140. The Kayin Phyu language. 2022
no. 141. The Subao Kayan language. 2022
no. 142. The Kabu Kayan language. 2022
A handbook of comparative Kayan languages. 2020

References

External links
CiNii
Linguistic survey of Tay cultural area (LSTCA) books

Living people
1946 births
Linguists from Japan
Linguists of Sino-Tibetan languages
Linguists of Kra–Dai languages
Linguists of Hmong–Mien languages
People from Ishikawa Prefecture
Academic staff of Tokyo University of Foreign Studies
Linguists of Loloish languages